Rynner Van Heste (July 26, 1853 – August 8, 1931) was an American road cyclist.

In his career he won one of the oldest cycling races in Europe in 1870, Firenze–Pistoia.

References

1853 births
1931 deaths
American male cyclists